Scopula kohor is a moth of the family Geometridae. It was described by Claude Herbulot and Pierre Viette in 1952. It is endemic to Chad.

References

Moths described in 1952
kohor
Endemic fauna of Chad
Moths of Africa
Taxa named by Claude Herbulot
Taxa named by Pierre Viette